Hubbell is an unincorporated community in the southwestern corner of Jefferson Township, Owen County, in the U.S. state of Indiana. It lies near the intersection of County Road 750 South (aka Hubbell Station) and Indiana Highway 157, which is a community nearly twenty miles southwest of the city of Spencer, the county seat.  Its elevation is 528 feet (161 m), and it is located at  (39.1830989 -87.0122322). This community is also known as Hubbells Station.

History
A post office was established at Hubbell in 1881, and remained in operation until it was discontinued in 1883. Mary E. Hubbell served as the postmaster.

Geography
 Eel River is south, while Lick Creek is east of this community.
 The Von Sloughs Airport  is about two miles northeast of this community, and it is located on Coal City – Arney Road on the west side of Beech Creek  (39.1967100 -86.9925097).
 Bush Cemetery is about two miles north of this community, and it is located on the south side of Indiana Highway 157  (39.2042097 -87.0269549).
 Little John Cemetery is about two miles north of this community, and it is located on the south side of Col City- Arney Road (39.2005988 -87.0000099).

School districts
 Spencer-Owen Community Schools, including a high school.

Political districts
 State House District 46
 State Senate District 39

References

External links
   Roadside Thoughts for Hubbell, Indiana

Unincorporated communities in Owen County, Indiana
Unincorporated communities in Indiana